The People's Institute was a building in Heyrod Street, Ancoats, Manchester, England. It was a popular meeting place for such groups as the Chartists and Irish confederates.

References

Buildings and structures in Manchester
Chartism